Sinopah (Ap'-ah-ki) (c. 1796-c. 1880) was a Blackfeet Confederacy woman married to interpreter Hugh Monroe. She was also the daughter of Blackfeet Confederacy Chief Lone Walker. Sinopah Mountain, located in Glacier National Park in the U.S. state of Montana, in named after her. Sinopah means "kit fox" in Blackfeet.

Life 
Sinopah was born in the Montana Territory and was part of the Blackfeet Confederacy. Her father was Pikuni Chief Lone Walker (Ni-to-wa-wa-ka). In 1920 she married Hugh "Rising Wolf" Monroe, a white trapper and interpreter who became part of the Blackfeet tribe. During their marriage they were trappers and hunters in multiple places including the Canadian province of Saskatchewan, Fort Benton, Montana, and the area around Glacier National Park. Differing accounts list the couple as having between seven and ten children. Family members reported that she died before 1880 but the exact date and place are unknown. Mountains named for her father (Lone Walker Mountain) and husband (Rising Wolf Mountain) are on either side of the mountain named in her honor in Glacier National Park.

References

Indigenous women of the Americas

1796 births
1880 deaths